NobelTel, LLC is a wholesale telecom carrier division founded in 2003 by Thomas Knobel, a young entrepreneur from Switzerland. NobelTel operates a TDM/VoIP network and supplies minutes to international carriers, thus being the underlying carrier for several online phone card sites owned by Nobel. The division also buys and sells routes throughout the world. Currently NobelTel's interconnection network consists of over 400 active carrier interconnections and continues to expand.

History 

In 2003, five years after Thomas Knobel had founded the telecom company Nobel, the NobelTel wholesale carrier division was launched in order to service all of the company's retail traffic.

On June 20, 2008 NobelTel has been accredited by the Better Business Bureau.

On May 13, 2010, NobelTel acquires Aries Network, Inc. by transfer of control over Aries from its current owner, Kulait Khalaf, to NobelTel. The application was granted by the FCC on May 13, 2010.

Business Divisions 

 TalkHome offers long distance phone services to distributors in the United States.
 NobelTalk is a consumer division that has Arabic communities as its main targeted audience. It offers both postpaid and prepaid calling solutions.
 NobelBiz is the business division that provides telecommunications services intended to increase the efficiency of contact centers. NobelBiz executive Raymond Pollum received the prestigious Fulcrum Award during the American Teleservices Association's (ATA) Annual Convention and Expo in New Orleans, Louisiana.

See also
 Nobel (company)
 Telephone cards

References

External links 
 NobelTalk
 NobelTel
 NobelBiz

Telecommunications companies of the Caribbean
Telecommunications companies established in 2003